Oceanotitan (meaning "ocean giant") is a genus of titanosauriform sauropod known from the Upper Jurassic Praia da Amoreira-Porto Novo Formation of Portugal. It contains one species, Oceanotitan dantasi.

The holotype consists of the scapula, almost all of the pelvis, a complete leg and pes, and nine caudals.

References 

Macronarians
Late Jurassic dinosaurs of Europe
Jurassic Portugal
Fossils of Portugal
Fossil taxa described in 2019